This is a list of Governorates of Iraq by Human Development Index as of 2023 with data for the year 2021.

See also
 List of countries by Human Development Index

References 

Economy of Iraq
Iraq
Iraq
Governorates of Iraq by HDI